Emma Maud Valborg Larsson (born 15 November 1998) is a Swedish female artistic gymnast and a member of the national team. Larsson participated at the 2015 World Artistic Gymnastics Championships in Glasgow, and eventually qualified for 2016 Summer Olympics, where she placed thirty-fifth in the qualifying stage of the competition with a total score of 54.332.

References

External links 

1998 births
Living people
Swedish female artistic gymnasts
People from Eskilstuna
Gymnasts at the 2016 Summer Olympics
Olympic gymnasts of Sweden
Sportspeople from Södermanland County
21st-century Swedish women